Eusebio L. Elizondo Almaguer, M.Sp.S. (August 3, 1954) is a Mexican-born American prelate of the Roman Catholic Church who has been serving as an auxiliary bishop of the Archdiocese of Seattle in Washington State since 2005.

Biography

Early life 
Eusebio L. Elizondo was born on August 3, 1954, in Victoria, Tamaulipas, México. He studied at the Pontifical Gregorian University in Rome.  He professed his vows to the Missionaries of the Holy Spirit Order in 1974. 

Elizondo was ordained a priest for the Missionaries Order by Bishop Ricardo Manuel Watty Urquidi on August 18, 1984.

Auxiliary Bishop of Seattle
Elizondo was appointed as an auxiliary bishop of the Archdiocese of Seattle as well as titular bishop of Acholla on May 12, 2005, by Pope Benedict XVI.  Elizondo was consecrated the first Hispanic bishop by Archbishop Alexander Brunett in Seattle on June 6, 2005.

See also

Roman Catholic Archdiocese of Seattle
 Catholic Church hierarchy
 Catholic Church in the United States
 Historical list of the Catholic bishops of the United States
 List of Catholic bishops of the United States
 Lists of patriarchs, archbishops, and bishops

References

External links
 Roman Catholic Archdiocese of Seattle Official Site

Episcopal succession
 

}

21st-century American Roman Catholic titular bishops
1954 births
Living people
Roman Catholic Archdiocese of Seattle
Pontifical Gregorian University alumni
Religious leaders from Washington (state)
People from Tamaulipas
Mexican emigrants to the United States